A Kid For Two Farthings is a 1955 film, directed by Carol Reed. The screenplay was adapted by Wolf Mankowitz from his 1953 novel of the same name. 
The title is a reference to the traditional Passover song, "Chad Gadya", which begins "One little goat which my father bought for two zuzim". At the end of the film, Mr. Kandinsky softly sings fragments of an English translation of the song.

It was one of the last films produced by Alexander Korda before his death.

Plot
In the busy wholesale-retail world of London's East End everyone, it seems, has unattainable dreams. Then a small boy – Joe – buys a unicorn, in fact a sickly little goat, with just one twisted horn in the middle of its forehead. This, he has been led to believe by a local tailor, Kandinsky, will bring everyone good fortune.

The film has a haunting last image, of Kandinsky carrying the tiny body of the "unicorn" to the graveyard, whilst passing in the opposite direction is a Torah-reading Rabbi pushing a horn gramophone, a character that appears in the background several times during the film.

Cast
 Celia Johnson as Joanna
 Diana Dors as Sonia
 David Kossoff as Mr. Kandinsky
 Joe Robinson as Sam
 Jonathan Ashmore as Joe
 Brenda De Banzie as 'Lady' Ruby
 Primo Carnera as Python Macklin
 Lou Jacobi as Blackie Isaacs
 Irene Handl as Mrs. Abramowitz
 Danny Green as Bason
 Sydney Tafler as Madam Rita
 Sid James as Ice Berg
 Daphne Anderson as Dora
 Harry Baird as Jamaica
 Joseph Tomelty as Vagrant
 Harold Berens as Oliver

Production
Film rights to the novel were purchased by Carol Reed, who had made another film featuring a child protagonist, The Fallen Idol, a few years previously.  After making The Man Between, Reed wanted to do something smaller scale.

The role of the six-year old went to Jonathan Ashmore.

The New York Times called Diana Dors' casting "a surprise choice" because "she has made no films of consequence before and has usually been thought of as a kind of junior Marilyn Monroe."

Filming started in June 1954. It took place at the studio and on location at Petticoat Lane in London. It was Carol Reed's first movie in colour.

Korda had just signed a deal with Romulus for them to distribute his movies. Kid for Two Farthings was the first.

Sidney Gilliat said he wanted to direct the film. He later said "I never would have thought of making it a non Jewish subject. But Carol managed to make the whole thing without a single reference to the character's background or religion at any point. And it was a very Jewish story. It lost a tremendous amount through not being a Jewish story." Gilliat also felt "all his little boys turned out to be beautifully well behaved prep school boys. "

Reception

Critical response
Reviews for the film were mixed. Reed said, "I loved that book. The film was alright in parts but not in others. It cost very little money but did well."

Filmink said it contained " an archetypal Dors performance in many ways – she's down-to-earth, warm, kind, the best looking girl in a low-rent area (glamorous, but "East End" glamorous)."

Awards
A Kid for Two Farthings was nominated for a Golden Palm at the 1955 Cannes Film Festival.

Box office
According to the Monthly Film Herald The film was the 9th most popular movie at the British box office in 1955, after The Dam Busters, White Christmas, Doctor at Sea, The Colditz Story, Seven Brides for Seven Brothers, Above Us the Waves, One Good Turn, and Raising a Riot. The film's popularity helped exhibitors vote Diana Dors the 9th most popular British star in British films (after Dirk Bogarde, John Mills, Norman Wisdom, Alastair Sim, Kenneth More, Jack Hawkins, Richard Todd and Michael Redgrave, and in front of Alec Guinness.) According to Kinematograph Weekly it was a "money maker" at the British box office in 1955.

Notes

References

External links
 
 
 
 
 Review of film at Variety
 

1955 films
1950s fantasy drama films
British fantasy drama films
Films based on British novels
Films directed by Carol Reed
Films scored by Benjamin Frankel
London Films films
Films set in London
Professional wrestling films
Films with screenplays by Wolf Mankowitz
1955 drama films
1950s English-language films
1950s British films